Félix Antoine Tshisekedi Tshilombo (born 13 June 1963) is a Congolese politician who has been the President of the Democratic Republic of the Congo since 24 January 2019. He is the leader of the Union for Democracy and Social Progress (UDPS), the DRC's oldest and largest party, succeeding his late father Étienne Tshisekedi in that role, a three-time Prime Minister of Zaire and opposition leader during the reign of Mobutu Sese Seko. Tshisekedi was the UDPS party's candidate for president in the December 2018 general election, which he was awarded, despite accusations of irregularities from several election monitoring organisations and other opposition parties. The Constitutional Court of the DRC upheld his victory after another opposition politician, Martin Fayulu, challenged the result, but Tshisekedi has been accused of making a deal with his predecessor, Joseph Kabila. The election marked the first peaceful transition of power since the state became independent from Belgium in 1960.

Since the Common Front for Congo (FCC) coalition, which is aligned with Kabila, still controlled the parliament and provincial governorships, Tshisekedi's ability to govern or even appoint a new Prime Minister was limited for the first six months of his term. He named his coalition partner and political heavyweight, Vital Kamerhe, as his Chief of Cabinet, at first having designated him prime minister but not having the parliamentary support to get him appointed. In May 2019 he arrived at a deal with the parliament's Kabila-aligned majority to appoint Sylvestre Ilunga prime minister. On 27 July 2019, negotiations finally ended between Tshisekedi and the parliament, agreeing on the formation of a new cabinet.

Early life and education
Tshisekedi, a member of the Luba ethnic group, was born in Kinshasa on 13 June 1963 to mother Marthe and father Étienne Tshisekedi, who served as Prime Minister of Zaire in the 1990s. He had a comfortable life as a youth in the capital, but when his father created the UDPS in the early 1980s, publicly opposing Mobutu, Félix was forced to accompany him into house arrest in his native village in central Kasaï. This put his studies on hold. In 1985, Mobutu allowed him, his mother, and his brothers to leave Kasaï. He went on to live in Brussels, Belgium, where he worked at odd jobs and became an active UDPS member.

Political career
In late 2008, Tshisekedi was named the UDPS National Secretary for external relations. In November 2011, he obtained a seat in the National Assembly, representing the city of Mbuji Mayi in Kasai-Oriental province. He did not take his seat, citing a fraudulent election, and his mandate was invalidated for "absenteeism".

In May 2013, he refused a position of rapporteur at the Independent National Electoral Commission (CENI), saying that he did not want to put his political career on hold as CENI's article 17 excludes membership for those who are members of a political formation.

In October 2016, Tshisekedi became vice secretary general of the UDPS. On 31 March 2018, he was elected to lead the UDPS, after his father's death on 1 February 2017. The same day, the UDPS nominated him for president in the December 2018 general election.

Elections and presidency
On 10 January 2019, it was announced that Tshisekedi had won the presidency of the DRC in the December 2018 election. He defeated another opposition leader, Martin Fayulu, and Emmanuel Ramazani Shadary, who was supported by term-limited outgoing President Kabila, who had been president for 18 years. Fayulu, the runner-up, alleged rigging and challenged the election results. On 19 January, the Constitutional Court, dismissed the challenge, officially making Tshisekedi president-elect. He was sworn in as president on 24 January 2019, taking office the next day. This marked the first time since the Congo gained independence in 1960 that an incumbent president peacefully transferred power to the opposition.

On 20 January, South Africa congratulated Tshisekedi on his election despite the African Union and EU warning of doubts over the result announced by the Constitutional Court.  After Tshisekedi was sworn in, it was reported that a member of Kabila's coalition would be picked to serve as his Prime Minister.

On 13 March 2019, Tshisekedi signed a decree to pardon approximately 700 prisoners, including imprisoned political opponents of Kabila, and this decision followed his promise to allow the return of exiles given the week before.

In early 2019, negotiations were underway between Tshisekedi and Kabila's FCC coalition that controlled the National Assembly and Senate. In late April, Jeune Afrique reported that Kabila proposed to Tshisekedi the mining company executive Albert Yuma as a candidate for prime minister. Yuma supports the new Mining Code adopted in 2018, which put the DRC in dispute with international mining companies, and Tshisekedi has been under foreign pressure to not appoint him. The Civil Society of South Kivu recommended to Tshisekedi the appointment of his chief of staff Vital Kamerhe as prime minister. For months, Tshisekedi continued working with ministers of Kabila's government as he was hamstrung by parliament. He faced challenges in dealing with the Kivu conflict as well as the Ebola outbreak in the region. In early March, Tshisekedi started a program to improve infrastructure, transport, education, housing, communication, health, water, and agriculture.

Most of the provincial governorships were also won by Kabila-affiliated candidates.

On 20 May 2019, Tshisekedi reached a deal with the FCC coalition and Kabila, appointing the career civil servant Sylvestre Ilunga as prime minister. Ilunga began his political career in the 1970s and held a number of cabinet posts under Mobutu Sese Seko before his overthrow in 1997. He is also an ally of Kabila. In late July 2019, Tshisekedi reached a deal with parliament on forming a new government. Ilunga's new cabinet would include 65 members, 48 ministers and 17 vice-ministers, which should be divided between the Kabila-aligned FCC and Tshisekedi's CACH alliance. The majority of the ministries went to the FCC, including three of the six most important ones (Defence, Justice, and Finance), while the Foreign Affairs, Interior, and Budget portfolios went to Tshisekedi's allies.

After a power struggle saw the coalition with allies of Tshisekedi's predecessor break down and many legislators were won over, Ilunga was forced to leave office and Tshisekedi appointed Gécamines leader Jean-Michel Sama Lukonde as successor on 15 February 2021.

On 12 April 2021, Tshisekedi formally ended his two-year coalition with Kabila and his allies when prime minister Sama Lukonde formed a new government. On national television, Tshisekedi’s spokesman Kasongo Mwema Yamba Yamba announced a number of new appointments, including Antoinette N’Samba Kalambayi as mines minister. The president succeeded to oust the last remaining elements of his government who were loyal to Kabila.

Tshisekedi has called for a review of mining contracts signed with China by his predecessor Joseph Kabila, especially the Sicomines multibillion 'minerals-for-infrastructure' deal. He has also promised to end and reverse deforestation in the Democratic Republic of the Congo by 2030, in the COP26 climate summit's first major agreement.

In October 2022, Tshisekedi ruled out bringing in Russian mercenaries to help quell a raging conflict in the east of the country and vowed to press on with economic development plans despite the insecurity in the region.

See also
 List of heads of state of the Democratic Republic of the Congo

References

External links
 
 

|-

|-

1963 births
Living people
Democratic Republic of the Congo democracy activists
Luba people
People from Kinshasa
Presidents of the Democratic Republic of the Congo
Union for Democracy and Social Progress (Democratic Republic of the Congo) politicians
Chairpersons of the African Union
21st-century Democratic Republic of the Congo people